Antenna is the eleventh studio album by the American rock band ZZ Top, released in 1994. It was the band's first album to be released on the RCA label. 

The single "Pincushion", reached #1 on the Mainstream Rock Tracks chart in the US. The second single "Breakaway" featured a non-album b-side "Mary's"

Track listing

Personnel 
 Billy Gibbons – guitar, lead and backing vocals
 Dusty Hill – bass guitar, keyboard, backing vocals, lead vocals on "World of Swirl", "Antenna Head", and "Deal Goin' Down", rhythm guitar on “Breakaway”.
 Frank Beard – drums, percussion (dominated percussion in 2)

Production 
 Producers – Billy Gibbons, Bill Ham
 Engineers – Joe Hardy, Tom Harding
 Mixing –  Joe Hardy
 Mastering – Bob Ludwig
 Photography –  Bill Bernstein, Barbara LaBarge
 Text –  Jim Bessman

Charts

Album

Singles

Certifications

Notes

References 

ZZ Top albums
1994 albums
Albums produced by Billy Gibbons
Albums produced by Bill Ham
RCA Records albums